A simple magic cube is the lowest of six basic classes of magic cubes. These classes are based on extra features required.

The simple magic cube requires only the basic features a cube requires to be magic. Namely, all lines parallel to the faces, and all 4 space diagonals sum correctly. i.e. all "1-agonals" and all "3-agonals" sum to

No planar diagonals (2-agonals) are required to sum correctly, so there are probably no magic squares in the cube.

See also 
 Magic square
 Magic cube classes

References

External links 
  Aale de Winkel - Magic hypercubes encyclopedia
 Harvey Heinz - large site on magic squares and cubes
  Christian Boyer - Multimagic cubes
  John Hendricks site on magic hypercubes

Magic squares
Recreational mathematics